Richard Lindsay Nicholson  (29 October 1882 – 1 November 1940) was a British captain of the Royal Navy.

Military career
Richard Lindsay Nicholson was born on 29 October 1882 in New Delhi. He began his military career on 15 January 1898. He was promoted to Lieutenant on 15 August 1904 and to Lieutenant-Commander on 15 August 1912. A year later Nicholson was promoted to Commander on 31 December 1915. After participating in the Battle of Jutland, Nicholson was praised for his wireless telegraph work and the organisation of it on 15 September 1916. Richard then served as the Director of Signal Division on 5 January 1918. After the war's conclusion, Nicholson was placed on the Retirement list at his own request and ultimately promoted to Captain in 1927. On 9 July 1926 Nicholson became a Fellow of the Royal Society of Arts at the Annual General Meeting that year.

References

1882 births
1940 deaths
British people in colonial India
People from Delhi
Captains of the Royal Navy
Royal Navy officers of World War I
Companions of the Distinguished Service Order
Place of death missing